Sons of Adam or son of Adam or variation, may refer to:
 Sons of Adam are group of revolutionaries who believe in Black Adam can save them and free Kahndaq from the dictator. They resurrected Adam and he allied himself with them to dethrone the one who took the name of Kahndaq's greatest oppressor Ibac.  
 a poetic allusion to humans
 Cain and Abel, the biblical sons of Adam and Eve 
 "Son of man" or "son of Adam", a biblical term
 Sons of Adam (Bani Adam; ;), a Persian poem by Saadi Shirazi
 The Sons of Adam, a U.S. garage rock band, formerly Fender IV
 Son of Adam, the Narnian term for people transported from Earth to Narnia (world)
 Sons of Adam, a 1945 Egyptian film by Abo El Seoud El Ebiary
 Sons of Adam (play), a stageplay by Beatrix Thomson
 Son of Adam (book), a 1990 memoir by Denis Forman

See also

 Adamsen
 Adamsson
 Adamson (disambiguation)
 Adams (disambiguation)
 Adam (disambiguation)
 Son (disambiguation)

 Son of man (disambiguation)
 Human (disambiguation)
 Human Being (disambiguation)
 Bani Adam (disambiguation) (lit. Sons of Adam; ;)